OHB SE is a European multinational technology corporation. Headquartered in Bremen, Germany, the corporation consists of the two business divisions Space Systems and Aerospace + Industrial Products. A key product of the corporation is fully integrated spacecraft. At present OHB is the third largest corporation in Europe's space sector.

The company OHB System AG is a major constituent of the OHB corporation. This company was founded in 1958 as a marine systems outfitter. The name OHB originates from this time; the name is an initialism of Otto Hydraulic Bremen. However the activities of the company shifted toward space technology in the 1980s after the couple Christa Fuchs and Manfred Fuchs took over ownership of the company.

Organisation
OHB is set up as a Societas Europae – a European company. The OHB SE group encompasses subsidiaries across the European Union.

Projects
The company has been working on numerous German, European and international projects related to small satellites, manned space flight as well as security and reconnaissance technologies.

Examples of OHB satellite missions for telecommunication, earth observation and reconnaissance are Small GEO (Hispasat AG1), BREMSAT, SAFIR 1&2, BIRD/RUBIN, ABRIXAS and the first German reconnaissance satellite system, SAR-Lupe.
Examples of OHB microgravity facilities are the International Space Station racks Fluid Science Laboratory and European Physiology Modules.
Projects OHB demonstrated at the 2006 Berlin Air Show included CONDOR/ARDS, an airborne modular reconnaissance system, and Mona Lisa, a study for planning and implementing a lunar exploration program.
 On 7 January 2010, the European Commission announced that the contract to build the first 14 operational satellites for the Galileo Global Satellite Navigation System was awarded to OHB System and Surrey Satellite Technology Limited (SSTL). Fourteen satellites will be built at a cost of €566m ($811m; £510m). The first two are expected to be ready in October 2012.
 In February 2012, an additional order of eight satellites was awarded to OHB Systems for €250M ($327M), after outbidding EADS Astrium tender offer. Thus bringing the total to 22 FOC satellites.
In 2014/2015, OHB was in talks with OneWeb as part of a potential joint venture to open a new facility for manufacturing approximately 900 -small Internet-delivery satellites.  OHB is just one of five European and US manufacturers competing to build these sub- satellites.
 In 2018 the ESA NEOSTEL ("Flyeye") telescope was under construction, due for completion in 2019, ready for installation in Sicily in 2020 by the Italian Space Agency.
 In 2018, the Institut Laue–Langevin and European Synchrotron Radiation Facility announce a new partnership between the two research centers and OHB SE.
In 2018, OHB SE founded the fully owned subsidiary start-up company Rocket Factory Ausgburg (RFA). RFA's goal is the development of a highly reliable, low-cost small-satellite launcher.
In 2019 MT Mechatronics (subsidiary of OHB SE), together with Illinois-based Ingersoll Machine Tools signed a contract to build the support structure of the Giant Magellan Telescope. The total value of the contract is $135 million. The structure is expected to be delivered to Chile at the end of 2025.

As of 2019 OHB hopes to have a small rocket launcher capable of sending 200 kilograms to low Earth orbit conduct a first flight by the end of 2021.

Galileo 
On January 7, 2010, the European Commission awarded a contract worth 566 million euros to build the first 14 operational satellites of the Galileo satellite navigation system to OHB-System and Surrey Satellite Technology Limited (SSTL) 4. The first two are ready in October 2012. On February 2, 2012, OHB-System won a new contract worth 255 million euros, covering 8 additional satellites.

In 2013, a significant delay was announced for the program due to the failure of OHB, which called for help from Astrium and Thales Alenia Space, resulting in controversy over the governance of the program and the choice of OHB.

Corporate history 

The OHB Systems AG was founded in 1958 as a marine outfitter company in Hemelinger harbour, Bremen. The name is an initialism of Otto Hydraulic Bremen.

In 1981 Christa and Manfred Fuchs became involved with OHB. At the time OHB was a small company of 5 employees doing hydraulic and electrical work, mainly for the Bundeswehr. In 1985 Manfred Fuchs took over the OHB completely. Under Fuchs, OHB changed its focus to satellite and aviation technology. In 2000, the company changed the meaning of OHB to High-technology Bremen Orbitals (German:Orbitale Hochtechnologie Bremen).

In 2009, the company had grown into 1,600 employee company.

In 1 September 2014, OHB Systems AG and Kayser-Threde Gmbh merged.

References

External links
 Official website

Aerospace companies of Germany
Defence companies of Germany
Companies based in Bremen
Manufacturing companies based in Bremen (state)
Spacecraft manufacturers